Rocco Anthony Quattrocchi (January 13, 1927 – April 10, 2015) was an American politician and businessman.

Born in Providence, Rhode Island, Quattrocchi went to Classical High School, University of Bologna Medical School, and University of Rhode Island. He served in the United States Army during World War II. Quattrocchi owned The Douglas Oil Company. He served in the Rhode Island House of Representatives in 1969 and 1970 and in the Rhode Island State Senate from 1971 to 1984. Quattrocchi was a Democrat and had also served as the Rhode Island state Democratic chairman.

Notes

1927 births
2015 deaths
Politicians from Providence, Rhode Island
University of Rhode Island alumni
Businesspeople from Providence, Rhode Island
Democratic Party members of the Rhode Island House of Representatives
Democratic Party Rhode Island state senators
20th-century American businesspeople